Yearning is a 1990 Armenian drama film based on Hrachya Kochar's novel Nostalgia. Directed by Frunze Dovlatyan.

Plot
(From IMDb)

The story takes place in 1930s Soviet Armenia. Arakel Aloyan is a naive peasant who left his homeland in Western Armenia after the Armenian genocide of 1915, having witnessed his village burnt and women raped. All the efforts of family members to persuade Arakel to accustom himself to a new life in Soviet Armenia are in vain whilst he suffers from nostalgia. After having a vision one sleepless night, Arakel crosses the Soviet-Turkish border, visits his village ("to visit the tombs of my parents, to kiss the remaining walls of our village church"), and is interrogated by Kurdish cavalrymen who report that his village no longer exists. After returning, he's captured by the NKVD (Soviet state security) and accused of "spying against the state." He tragically ends his life in the exile train to Siberia.

1990 films
1990 drama films
Films directed by Frunze Dovlatyan
Films set in Armenia
Films set in the Soviet Union
Films set in Turkey
Soviet drama films
Armenian drama films
Soviet-era Armenian films